Sofikənd (also, Sofi-kənd, Sofukend, and Safi-Kend) is a village in the Quba Rayon of Azerbaijan.  The village forms part of the municipality of Qamqam.

References

External links

Populated places in Quba District (Azerbaijan)